Henri Grethen (born 16 July 1950) is a politician from Luxembourg.

Grethen was born in Esch-sur-Alzette. He attended school in Echternach and studied in Luxembourg and Liège.  In 1980, he became secretary of the Democratic Party, and in 1999, he became Minister for Economy and Transport.
He currently works for the European Court of Auditors as representative for Luxembourg.

References

|-

Ministers for the Economy of Luxembourg
Ministers for Transport of Luxembourg
Members of the Chamber of Deputies (Luxembourg)
Members of the Chamber of Deputies (Luxembourg) from Sud
Democratic Party (Luxembourg) politicians
1950 births
Living people
People from Esch-sur-Alzette